William Alan Richard Fraine (born 13 June 1996) is an English cricketer. He made his first-class debut on 28 March 2017 for Durham MCCU against Gloucestershire as part of the Marylebone Cricket Club University fixtures. He made his List A debut for Nottinghamshire in the 2018 Royal London One-Day Cup on 17 May 2018. He made his Twenty20 debut for Nottinghamshire in the 2018 t20 Blast on 6 July 2018.

Fraine studied at Collingwood College, Durham for a degree in Sport, Exercise and Physical Activity.

References

External links
 

1996 births
Living people
English cricketers
Durham MCCU cricketers
Alumni of Collingwood College, Durham
Nottinghamshire cricketers
Yorkshire cricketers
Cricketers from Huddersfield
English cricketers of the 21st century
Mashonaland Eagles cricketers